In mathematics, the Borel–Weil–Bott theorem is a basic result in the representation theory of Lie groups, showing how a family of representations can be obtained from holomorphic sections of certain complex vector bundles, and, more generally, from higher sheaf cohomology groups associated to such bundles. It is built on the earlier Borel–Weil theorem of Armand Borel and André Weil, dealing just with the space of sections (the zeroth cohomology group), the extension to higher cohomology groups being provided by Raoul Bott. One can equivalently, through Serre's GAGA, view this as a result in complex algebraic geometry in the Zariski topology.

Formulation
Identifying  with its sheaf of holomorphic sections, we consider the sheaf cohomology groups . Since  acts on the total space of the bundle  by bundle automorphisms, this action naturally gives a -module structure on these groups; and the Borel–Weil–Bott theorem gives an explicit description of these groups as -modules.

It is straightforward to check that this defines a group action, although this action is not linear, unlike the usual Weyl group action. Also, a weight  is said to be dominant if  for all simple roots .

Given an integral weight , one of two cases occur:
 There is no  such that  is dominant, equivalently, there exists a nonidentity  such that ; or
 There is a unique  such that  is dominant.
The theorem states that in the first case, we have

 for all ;

and in the second case, we have

 for all , while

It is worth noting that case (1) above occurs if and only if  for some positive root .

Example

Positive characteristic
One also has a weaker form of this theorem in positive characteristic. Namely, let  be a semisimple algebraic group over an algebraically closed field of characteristic . This is known as the Kempf vanishing theorem. However, the other statements of the theorem do not remain valid in this setting.

More explicitly, let  be a dominant integral weight; then it is still true that  for all , but it is no longer true that this -module is simple in general, although it does contain the unique highest weight module of highest weight  as a -submodule. If  is an arbitrary integral weight, it is in fact a large unsolved problem in representation theory to describe the cohomology modules  in general.

Borel–Weil theorem
The Borel–Weil theorem provides a concrete model for irreducible representations of compact Lie groups and irreducible holomorphic representations of complex semisimple Lie groups. These representations are realized in the spaces of global sections of holomorphic line bundles on the flag manifold of the group. The Borel–Weil–Bott theorem is its generalization to higher cohomology spaces.

Statement of the theorem 
The theorem can be stated either for a complex semisimple Lie group  or for its compact form . In this scenario,  is a complex manifold and a nonsingular algebraic .

(A holomorphic representation of a complex Lie group is one for which the corresponding Lie algebra representation is complex linear.)

Concrete description 
The weight  gives rise to a character (one-dimensional representation) of the Borel subgroup , which is denoted . Holomorphic sections of the holomorphic line bundle  over  may be described more concretely as holomorphic maps

 

Example 
Let  be the complex special linear group , with a Borel subgroup consisting of upper triangular matrices with determinant one. Integral weights for  may be identified with integers, with dominant weights corresponding to nonnegative integers, and the corresponding characters  of  have the form

 

Weight vectors are given by monomials

 

of weights , and the highest weight vector  has weight .

See also 
Theorem of the highest weight

Notes

References
 .
 . (reprinted by Dover)
 
A Proof of the Borel–Weil–Bott Theorem, by Jacob Lurie. Retrieved on Jul. 13, 2014.
.
.
.
. Reprint of the 1986 original.

Further reading
 

Representation theory of Lie groups
Theorems in representation theory